The 2018 World RX of Germany was the eleventh round of the fifth season of the FIA World Rallycross Championship. The event was held at the Estering in Buxtehude, Lower Saxony.

Supercar 
Source

Heats 

 Note: Liam Doran was disqualified from Q1 for having briefly touch the launch control button by mistake in turn 1. Timur Timerzyanov had the same issue, touching the button during his battle with Cyril Raymond in Q3.

Semi-finals 

 Semi-Final 1

Note: Timmy Hansen was disqualified for a contact with Anton Marklund.

 Semi-Final 2

Final

Standings after the event 

Source

 Note: Only the top five positions are included.

References 

|- style="text-align:center"
| style="width:35%;"|Previous race:2018 World RX of USA
| style="width:40%;"|FIA World Rallycross Championship2018 season
| style="width:35%;"|Next race:2018 World RX of South Africa
|- style="text-align:center"
| style="width:35%;"|Previous race:2017 World RX of Germany
| style="width:40%;"|World RX of Germany
| style="width:35%;"|Next race:2021 World RX of Germany
|- style="text-align:center"

Germany
World RX
World RX